A. Harry Morelock  (November 1869 – April 21, 1949) was a 19th-century Major League Baseball player. He played shortstop for the 1891–1892 Philadelphia Phillies of the National League. He remained active in the Minor leagues through 1895.

External links

19th-century baseball players
Major League Baseball shortstops
Philadelphia Phillies players
Albany Senators players
Buffalo Bisons (minor league) players
Rochester Flour Cities players
Macon Hornets players
Troy Trojans (minor league) players
Baseball players from Pennsylvania
1869 births
1949 deaths